{{Infobox person
| name               = Steve Burns
| image              = Steve Burns.png
| caption            = Burns in 2014
| birth_name         = Steven Michael Burns
| birth_date         = 
| birth_place        = Boyertown, Pennsylvania, U.S.
| education          = DeSales University
| occupation         = 
| years_active       = 1995–present
| module             = {{Infobox musical artist|embed=yes  
| background    = solo_singer
| instrument    = 
| genre         = 
| label         = PIAS Recordings
| associated_acts = {{hlist|The Flaming Lips|Steve Burns & The Struggle|STEVENSTEVEN}}
}}
}}
Steven Michael Burns (born October 9, 1973) is an American actor, television host, director, singer, and musician. He is best known as the original host of the long-running children's television program Blue's Clues from 1996 until 2002, for which he was nominated for a Daytime Emmy in 2001. Burns has also done voiceover work for advertising, including Rubbermaid, Gillette, Oral-B, and is the voice of the Snickers satisfies advertising campaign.

Early life and career
Burns was born in Boyertown, Pennsylvania, to Joseph Burns Jr. (1938–2015) and Janet Burns (née Petaccio). He has two sisters. His father served in the U.S. Navy and later became the human resources director of Safeguard Business Systems. He attended Boyertown Area Senior High School in Berks County, graduating in 1992.

Burns played in bands called Sudden Impact US, Nine Pound Truck, and the Ivys (which he has called a "Morrissey rip-off band") while in high school and college. He studied theatre under an acting scholarship at DeSales University in Center Valley, Pennsylvania, in the Lehigh Valley, where he was discovered by an agent. He dropped out of school and moved to New York City to become a professional actor. He lived in a basement apartment near Times Square, finding his first success as a voice-over artist for ads and making appearances on Homicide: Life on the Street and Law & Order.

Blue's Clues
In 1995, Burns auditioned for Blue's Clues, thinking it was a voice-over role for a game show. He modeled his audition performance after Christopher Walken. He had long hair and an earring. "I was a bit of a skate rat," he said. Initially, the Nickelodeon executives were not supportive of Burns hosting their new show; in subsequent auditions, the show's creators requested that he dress more conservatively. (Burns reported that the creators, in a call-back phone conversation, asked him, "Could you not look like yourself tomorrow morning?") It became apparent, however, that he was the favorite with preschool test audiences. Executive producer and co-creator Traci Paige Johnson reported that of the 100 people they auditioned, Burns was "the realest". As Alice Wilder, Nickelodeon's Director of Research and Development, said: "[T]here was just something about this kid, who was fresh out of Pennsylvania, who just knew where to look in the camera to really talk to kids. He was just right."Blue's Clues was an instant hit due to Burns's performances as much as the show's format. He became "a superstar" among his audience and their parents, but unknown to everyone else, and enjoyed what he called being a "micro-celebrity, about as small a celebrity as you can be". As The New York Times reported, he "developed an avid following among both preteen girls and mothers. The former send torrents of e-mail; the latter scrutinize the show with an intensity that might make even Elmo, the red Muppet, blush." In 2000, People included Burns in their annual list of America's most eligible bachelors. According to writer Diane Tracy, Burns was "destined for the part". Also, according to Tracy, Burns was not the typical children's television host: "There is nothing syrupy about him—his humor is sometimes borderline offbeat, but never inappropriate for preschoolers."

The show was filmed in a studio in Tribeca, Manhattan. Burns became "very involved" with the production of Blue's Clues from the beginning. One of the most challenging aspects of hosting the show was performing on the "blue screen" before the animation was added. Burns called it "maddening" and likened it to "acting at the bottom of a swimming pool".

Departure
After six years and 100 episodes, Burns left Blue's Clues in early 2001,http://www.cnn.com/2001/SHOWBIZ/News/01/01/showbuzz/   and in his final episodes, which aired as a three-part special on April 29, 2002, "Steve" introduced new host Donovan Patton as his younger brother "Joe".

According to Johnson, Burns never wanted to become a "children's host". He loved kids, but stated, "he could not make a life-long career out of it." Burns went on by saying, "I knew I wasn't going to be doing children's television all my life, mostly because I refused to lose my hair on a kid's TV show, and it was happening, fast." The day following the filming of his final episode for the show, he shaved his head – something that he wanted to do for several years, but the show's producers would not allow. He explained in a 2016 interview that "a lot of the original people on the show, like the people who created it, were all moving on to other careers. It just felt like time." In a 2022 Variety interview, Burns revealed that he suffered from clinical depression while on the show.

Burns's departure led to the resurfacing of rumors that had circulated about him since 1998, including death from a heroin overdose, being killed in a car accident, and (similar to rumors about Paul McCartney in 1966) being replaced with a look-alike. Burns made an appearance on The Rosie O'Donnell Show to dispel these rumors, and he and co-creator Angela Santomero appeared on The Today Show to help concerned parents extinguish the fears of kids who may have heard these rumors.

Burns consulted on the casting for the revival of Blue's Clues, titled Blue's Clues & You! and hosted by Joshua Dela Cruz. He and Patton reprised their roles in the premiere episode to welcome their cousin "Josh". Burns has written and directed several episodes of the new show.

Burns appeared in videos for the 25-year anniversary of Blue's Clues in 2021, including a widely watched Twitter video in which he – in character as the host of the show – explained reassuringly that he had never forgotten the viewers after leaving to go to college, and marveling at how much each of them had experienced since then.

Music and film career

Burns worked on material for his first album, Songs for Dustmites, for two and a half years at a small studio in his home in Brooklyn before it was produced by PIAS Records in late 2002. He started work on the album after he left Blue's Clues in 2002, and it was released in 2003. He posted eleven songs on his webpage and then realizing he needed help with drums and arrangements went to Steven Drozd of The Flaming Lips for advice. Drozd assisted Burns with six tracks, Lips bassist Michael Ivins engineered the album, and longtime Lips producer Dave Fridmann produced it. One of the songs from the album, "Mighty Little Man", is used as the opening theme for the CBS series Young Sheldon. Burns appeared on the series in January 2020, playing a Star Trek enthusiast whom the title character meets.

Burns started a band, Steve Burns and the Struggle, and completed his second album, Deep Sea Recovery Efforts, which was released in 2009. Members of the Struggle include Drozd and Ryan Smith of A Million Billion.

Burns acted in the 2007 horror-comedy film Netherbeast Incorporated with Darrell Hammond and Dave Foley, playing the part of a vampire. In 2008, he played an astronaut in Christmas on Mars, a science fiction film from The Flaming Lips. In March 2012, he appeared in the YouTube comedy series The Professionals.

He appeared in DeSales University's production of Amadeus as the title character in 2007 and also appeared in The Comedy of Errors.

In late 2016, Burns released a children's album with Drozd, titled Foreverywhere under the name "STEVENSTEVEN". They released a video of the album's first song, "The Unicorn and Princess Rainbow".

Burns made a guest appearance on Tim Kubart's 2018 children's album Building Blocks.

Personal life
After residing in Williamsburg, Brooklyn for much of his adult life, Burns currently resides near the Catskill Mountains.

Filmography
TV series
 Blue's Clues – Himself (also producer, co-producer, and consulting producer on some episodes)
 Blue's Clues & You! – Himself, Mapbook (voice) (also directed and wrote several episodes)
 Figure It Out – Himself, panelist (1999)
 Homicide: Life on the Street – David Tarnofski
 Jack's Big Music Show – Himself/performer along with Steven Drozd – episode:"Ground Hog Day"
 Law & Order – Kevin Jeffries
 Roll Play – Narrator (also art director and story editor)
 The Bedtime Business Song – Himself
 The Early Show – Himself
 The Panel – Himself
 The Professionals – Investor X
 The Rosie O'Donnell Show – Himself
 Today – Himself
 Yes, Dear – Himself
 Yo Gabba Gabba! – Himself
 Young Sheldon – Theme song performer, Nathan

TV specials
 The 42nd Annual New York Emmy Awards – Himself/Presenter
 Macy's Thanksgiving Day Parade – Himself

Video games
 Blue's 123 Time Activities – Himself
 Blue's ABC Time Activities – Himself
 Blue's Alphabet Book - Himself
 Blue's Art Time Activities – Himself
 Blue's Big Musical – Himself
 Blue's Birthday Adventure – Himself
 Blue's Reading Time Activities – Himself
 Blue's Treasure Hunt – Himself

Shorts
 Blue's Birthday – Himself
 La lecon – Arthur Knudson
 The Bill (2001) – Bill
 Hot Pants – Ben

Stage
 Amadeus – Mozart
 The Comedy of Errors – Dromio

Movies
 Blue's Big Musical Movie – Himself
 Christmas on Mars – Major Lowell
 Marie and Bruce – Fred
 Netherbeast Incorporated – Otto Granberry
 Who Framed Jesus – The Narrator
 Blue's Big City Adventure – Himself

Documentaries
 The Fearless Freaks – Himself
 I Love You, You Hate Me – Himself

Discography
 Songs for Dustmites (2003)
 Deep Sea Recovery Efforts (2009) (as Steve Burns and the Struggle)
 Foreverywhere'' (2017) (with Steven Drozd, as STEVENSTEVEN)

References

External links

 
  at MySpace
 Burns discusses his Blue's Clue experience on an episode of "The Moth Presents"

1973 births
Living people
People from Boyertown, Pennsylvania
Male actors from Pennsylvania
Guitarists from Pennsylvania
Singers from Pennsylvania
American male film actors
American male guitarists
American male stage actors
American male television actors
American male voice actors
American rock guitarists
American rock singers
American people of Italian descent
American people of Irish descent
DeSales University alumni
20th-century American singers
20th-century American guitarists
21st-century American guitarists
20th-century American male actors
21st-century American male actors
20th-century American male singers
21st-century American male singers
21st-century American singers